Bajo el mismo cielo (English title: Under the Same Sky), is an American telenovela created by Perla Farías for Telemundo. The telenovela is an adaptation of the  2011 American drama film A Better Life directed by Chris Weitz by the screenplay Eric Eason.

Plot 
Carlos Martínez (Gabriel Porras), an undocumented immigrant living in Los Angeles, is a good, hardworking man who wants to give a good future and better opportunities to his children. Carlos is a widowed man who only lives with his youngest son, Luis (Alejandro Speitzer). His oldest son, Rodrigo (Luis Ernesto Franco) became a gang member and left the house years ago, during his teenage years. Carlos faces several difficulties and dangers because of his legal situation, but remains optimistic and tries to live honestly and decently, working as a gardener. He has a relationship with a Mexican-American woman named Felicia (Erika de la Rosa) who owns a bar and is desperately obsessed with him. On the other side of the story, Adela Morales (María Elisa Camargo)is a young and beautiful woman who lives in Lancaster with her brother Matías (Carlos Ferro) and her alcoholic mother Laura (Rosalinda Rodríguez). Like Carlos, Adela came into the United States as a young girl and is also undocumented. Adela and Matías joined a gang named La Colonia since they were teens. La Colonia is led by Colmillo (Julio Bracho) and his right-hand, who is actually Rodrígo, now known as "El Faier". One day, one of Carlos co-workers and friend tells him that he is leaving the United States and will go back to México, so he wants to sell Carlos his old truck, so Carlos can continue working as a gardener and also start his own gardening business. Carlos borrows the money from his sister, María (Liz Gallardo) and purchases the truck. Meanwhile, Adela and Matías are taken prisoners by La Colonia, after the gang discovered that Matías is having deals with a rival gang. Noemí (Cristina Mason), another gang member, accuses them both to cover herself because she has been stealing drugs from La Colonia. Matías is killed by the order of Rodrígo, who ordered his death from jail, and Adela is marked down in her belly as a traitor. Adela escapes from La Colonia, and they start hunting her to kill her. One day, Carlos stops in a store to buy some supplies and parks his new truck outside. Adela is walking nearby, hiding from La Colonia. Suddenly she sees some members of La Colonia, and desperate to escape, she sees Carlos's truck and steals it. Carlos runs behind the truck and is able to get himself attached to the door. Carlos and Adela, despite the situation, fall in love at first sight, and from that moment starts their story together.

Cast

Main 
 Gabriel Porras as Carlos Martínez
 María Elisa Camargo as Adela Morales
 Erika de la Rosa as Felicia Méndez
 Luis Ernesto Franco as Rodrigo Martínez / El Faier
 Julio Bracho as José Giménez / El Colmillo
 Alejandro Speitzer as Luis Martínez
 Mercedes Molto as Deborah Sanders
 Kendra Santacruz as Greicy Cordero
 José Guillermo Cortines as Cristóbal Méndez
 Liz Gallardo as María Solís Martínez
 Fernando Noriega as Willy López
 Keller Wortham as Jacob Sanders
 Oka Giner as Susy Sanders
 Raúl Arrieta as Rudolfo Solís
 Freddy Flórez as Santiago Yépez
 Rosalinda Rodríguez as Laura Morales
 Ximena Ayala as Juana García
 Ahrid Hannaley as Isabel Garrido
 Kevin Aponte as Nick Hernández
 Andrés Zúñiga as Jay Ortega
 Felipe Betancourt as Gacho
 Cristina Mason as Noemí
 Giancarlo Vidrio as Mago
 Alma Itzel Méndez as Sharon López

Recurring 
 Cristian Adrian as El Alacrán
 Cristina Figarola as Oficial Ramírez
 Juan Pablo Llano as Erick Vilalta
 Braulio Hernández as Pedro Solís
 Nicole Arcí as Lupita Solís
Michelle Posada as Estela
 Xabier Rubalcaba as Young Rodrigo Martínez
 Roberto Escobar as Alan Landonie
Carlos Ferro as Matías Morales
 Adriana Bermúdez as Vanessa
Susy Rosado as Ximena

Ratings

Episodes

Awards and nominations

References

External links 

Telemundo telenovelas
American telenovelas
Spanish-language American telenovelas
2015 American television series debuts
2015 telenovelas
2016 American television series endings
Spanish-language television shows
Live action television shows based on films